The Jacksonville Progress is a three times a week newspaper published in Jacksonville, Texas, on Tuesday, Thursday and Saturday mornings. It is owned by  Community Newspaper Holdings Inc.

References

External links
 Official website
 CNHI Website

Newspapers published in Texas
Cherokee County, Texas